Igreja de Santiago de Palmela is a church in Portugal. It is classified as a National Monument.

References

Churches in Setúbal District
National monuments in Setúbal District
Burial sites of the House of Aviz